Etielloides curvella is a species of snout moth in the genus Etielloides. It was described by Shibuya in 1928, and is known from Japan.

The wingspan is 22–24 mm. The forewings are fuscous, but somewhat paler at the basal half of the dorsum and slightly tinged with reddish on the basal area. The hindwings are subhyaline and pale fuscous, becoming much paler towards the inner and basal areas.

References

Moths described in 1928
Phycitinae
Moths of Japan